The KTM 65 SX is a youth motorcycle made by KTM. The factory introduced the motorcycle in 1998, and it is still available. It has a 64 cc single-cylinder two-stroke water-cooled engine, a six-speed manual gearbox and 53 kg dry weight.

Model progression

2010 
New ignition cover (improved sealing) and new engine case (improved reliability).

65 SXS Factory Racing version 
KTM introduced the very limited edition SXS version. This version increases horsepower from 16 to 19.5, and includes FMF exhaust, a holeshot device, an aluminum ignition cover, and a tuned carburetor.

References

External links 
Official KTM model information

65 SX
Motorcycles introduced in 1998